Koringa (also known as Coringa) is a branch of the Godavari River flowing in the East Godavari District of Andhra Pradesh, India.

History
The river was also historically known as the Coringa, Koringa, Corangi, Coringuy.

Geography
The Goutami Godavari is the Eastern branch of the Godavari river, that splits at Vijjeswaram, while the Vasista Godavari is the Western branch. Other main branch is Vainateya, which splits at Dowleswaram. Tulya, Atreya and Bharadwaja are minor tributaries.

See also
 Yanam, Pondicherry
 Godavari River

Rivers of Andhra Pradesh
Geography of East Godavari district
Rivers of India